The 1992–93 season was the 92nd season in Athletic Bilbao's history and their 62nd consecutive season in La Liga, the top division of Spanish football.

Season summary

The previous season had been a turbulent one for Athletic, as head coach Iñaki Sáez was fired in February and replacement Jesús Aranguren steered them clear of the La Liga relegation playoffs by just two points. New ideas were required, and the club turned to Jupp Heynckes, out of work since being fired by Bayern Munich in his native Germany the previous October, who became Athletic's new head coach in July 1992.

Heynckes brought some much needed stability, and Bilbao were able to finish his first La Liga campaign in 8th place. They were somewhat less successful in the Copa del Rey, where they entered at the 3rd round and were immediately eliminated by Segunda División B side Xerez.

Squad statistics

Appearances and goals

|}

Results

La Liga

League table

See also
1992–93 La Liga
1992–93 Copa del Rey

References

External links
 

Athletic Bilbao
Athletic Bilbao seasons